Judy Gringer (born 23 January 1941) is a Danish film actress. She has appeared in 60 films since 1958. She was born in Copenhagen, Denmark.

Filmography 

 Til højre ved den gule hund (2003)
 Kærlighed ved første desperate blik (1994)
 Himmel og helvede (1988)
 Midt om natten (1984)
 Otto er et næsehorn (1983)
 Historien om en moder (1979)
 Slægten (1978)
 Firmaskovturen (1978)
 Familien Gyldenkål vinder valget (1977)
 Agent 69 Jensen i Skorpionens tegn (1977)
 Julefrokosten (1976)
 I Løvens tegn (1976)
 Nøddebo præstegård (1974)
 Den meget talende barber (1974)
 Prins Piwi (1974)
 Syg og munter (1974)
 Romantik på sengekanten (1973)
 Apollon fra Bellac (1973)
 Nu går den på Dagmar (1972)
 Dukkens død (1972)
 Lenin, din gavtyv (1972)
 Takt og tone i himmelsengen (1972)
 Min søsters børn, når de er værst (1971)
 Guld til præriens skrappe drenge (1971)
 Den afdøde (1971)
 Den gale dansker (1969)
 Dyrlægens plejebørn (1968)
 Sådan er de alle (1968)
 Smukke-Arne og Rosa (1967)
 Det er ikke appelsiner, det er heste (1967)
 Gift (1966)
 Ih, du forbarmende (1965)
 Fem mand og Rosa (1964)
 Når enden er go' (1964)
 Selvmordsskolen (1964)
 Majorens oppasser (1964)
 Et døgn uden løgn (1963)
 Sikke'n familie (1963)
 Hvis lille pige er du? (1963)
 Vi har det jo dejligt (1963)
 Pigen og pressefotografen (1963)
 Drømmen om det hvide slot (1962)
 Venus fra Vestø (1962)
 Oskar (1962)
 Det støver stadig (1962)
 Sømænd og svigermødre (1962)
 Det tossede paradis (1962)
 Poeten og Lillemor i forårshumør (1961)
 Peters baby (1961)
 Mine tossede drenge (1961)
 Sømand i knibe (1960)
 Poeten og Lillemor og Lotte (1960)
 Onkel Bill fra New York (1959)
 Poeten og Lillemor (1959)
 Vagabonderne på Bakkegården (1958)
 Mor skal giftes (1958)
 Soldaterkammerater (1958)
 Seksdagesløbet (1958)
 Verdens rigeste pige (1958)
 Guld og grønne skove (1958)

References

External links 
 
 
 Trailers with Judy Gringer

1941 births
Living people
Danish film actresses
Actresses from Copenhagen